Piotr Kieruzel (born 12 November 1988 in Kołobrzeg) is a Polish former footballer and current manager of Chojniczanka Chojnice II.

Career

Club
In January 2011, he joined Warta Poznań.

In July 2011, he signed a contract with Flota Świnoujście.

References

External links
 

1988 births
Living people
People from Kołobrzeg
Sportspeople from West Pomeranian Voivodeship
Association football defenders
Polish footballers
Ruch Chorzów players
Warta Poznań players
Flota Świnoujście players
Chojniczanka Chojnice players
Kotwica Kołobrzeg footballers
Ekstraklasa players
I liga players
II liga players
III liga players
Polish football managers
I liga managers